South Sauty Creek is  long with a drainage area of , and is a tributary to the Tennessee River. The river rises in DeKalb County, Alabama, and flows generally southwest along Sand Mountain from its headwaters before turning generally west and flowing off of Sand Mountain, through Buck's Pocket, terminating shortly afterwards into Lake Guntersville in an area known as Morgan's Cove.  South Sauty forms the Buck's Pocket canyon as the creek falls from the north side of Sand Mountain (Alabama).

References

 USGS Alabama StreamStats

Rivers of Alabama